A.C. Milan won the European Cup thanks to a 4–0 victory against Steaua București, with Dutch duo Ruud Gullit and Marco van Basten scoring twice each. It did not defend its Serie A title however, finishing 3rd in the standings. Milan also won the first Supercoppa Italiana, beating Sampdoria in the inaugural contest.

Squad

Transfers

Winter

Competitions

Serie A

League table

Results by round

Matches

Top scorers
  Marco van Basten 19
  Pietro Paolo Virdis 10
  Ruud Gullit 5
  Frank Rijkaard 4
  Angelo Colombo 3
  Alberigo Evani 3
  Graziano Mannari 3

Coppa Italia

First round- Group 3

Second round- Group 1

Supercoppa Italiana

European Cup

First round

Second round

Quarter-finals

Semi-finals

Final

Statistics

Players statistics

Footnotes

References

  RSSSF - Italy 1988/89

A.C. Milan seasons
Milan
UEFA Champions League-winning seasons